So Television is a production company established in 1998, founded by Irish comedian Graham Norton and Graham Stuart to make television shows. The company is well known for producing Norton's chat shows, including So Graham Norton and V Graham Norton for Channel 4 and The Graham Norton Show for BBC One and BBC Two. The company also produces various shows for BBC Radio 4 under the name of So Radio. So Television and So Radio are based in London, England. On 30 August 2012, ITV Studios acquired So Television for an estimated £17 million.

Selected shows

Awards

2002
Broadcast Awards – Best Entertainment Programme
BAFTA – Best Entertainment Performance
Rose D'Or Montreux – Bronze Rose Variety Programmes
TV Quick – Best Entertainment Programme
National TV Awards – Best Talk Show
British Comedy Awards – Best Entertainment Performance
British Comedy Awards – Best Entertainment Show
 
2001
International Emmy – Best Popular Arts
BAFTA – Best Entertainment Programme
BAFTA – Best Entertainment Performance
Royal Television Society Awards – Best Presenter
British Comedy Awards – Best Entertainment Series
TV Quick Awards – Best Entertainment Programme
 
2000
BAFTA – Best Entertainment Performer
British Comedy Awards – Best Entertainment Performance
Broadcasting Press Guild Awards – Best TV Performer
Television and Radio Industry Awards – Best TV Presenter
Variety Club Television – Personality of the Year
 
1999
British Comedy Awards – Best Talk Show
 
1998
British Comedy Awards – Best Newcomer
Perrier Comedy Awards – Nomination

References

External links

ITV (TV network)
Television production companies of the United Kingdom
Mass media companies established in 1998
2012 mergers and acquisitions